Sar Gust, also rendered as Sar Gost, Sargosk, and Sar Gasht, may refer to:
 Sar Gust-e Bala
 Sar Gust-e Pain